During the 2008–09 Danish football season, AaB Fodbold competed in the Danish Superliga.

Season summary
Bruce Rioch managed to guide AaB to the Champions League group stage, but was sacked after only two wins from the first 10 league games and a single point won from their first three Champions League games, with the team 11th in the Superliga. Interim manager Allan Kuhn went undefeated in his seven league games and three Champions League games, seeing the club rise to 6th and qualify for the UEFA Cup knockout stages. However, sporting director Lynge Jakobsen was wary of promoting Kuhn from assistant coach to head coach and instead opted to appoint Magnus Pehrsson as permanent head coach. Although Pehrsson only won 3 of his 16 league matches in charge, resulting in a final 7th-place finish (their lowest in 11 years), he achieved famous victories against Deportivo and Manchester City to take AaB to the round of 16 before elimination at the hands of the Mancunian team on penalties. He also took the team to the Danish Cup final; although they were defeated by F.C. Copenhagen, Copenhagen's title victory saw AaB qualify for the second qualifying round of the inaugural season of the UEFA Europe League.

First-team squad
Squad at end of season

Left club during season

Results

UEFA Champions League

Second qualifying round

Aalborg BK won 7–1 on aggregate.

Third qualifying round

Aalborg BK won 4–0 on aggregate.

Group stage

UEFA Cup

Round of 32

Aalborg BK won 6–1 on aggregate.

Round of 16

Manchester City 2–2 Aalborg BK on aggregate. Manchester City won 4–3 on penalties.

References

Notes

AaB Fodbold seasons
AaB Fodbold